The Institute for Contemporary Culture (ICC) is located in the Royal Ontario Museum (ROM) in Toronto, Ontario, Canada, and serves as the ROM’s window on contemporary society. While the ROM’s vast collection explores world cultures and natural history, the ICC focuses on contemporary works of art that connect living society with the cultural and natural artifacts of the ROM, including art installations, photography exhibits, and performance pieces. The ICC also coordinates the ROM’s involvement with major annual events in Toronto such as Nuit Blanche, Luminato, and the Toronto International Film Festival. The ICC has hosted many travelling exhibitions. One annual highlight each year is the Eva Holtby Lecture on Contemporary Culture.

The museum is located at the corner of Bloor Street and Avenue Road, north of Queen's Park.

History

Founded in 1989, the ICC was established to present the contemporary world to ROM audiences. After 2005, the ICC’s mandate became more focused.  Rather than investigating everything and anything contemporary, with Canadian subjects being given preference, the focus became cultural and socio-political issues of international significance examined through works of art. Although its exhibitions and programs tend to take a global perspective, Canadian relevance and content continues to be of important consideration.

Galleries

The ICC hosts its major exhibitions in the Roloff Beny Gallery on Level 4 of the Michael Lee-Chin Crystal. 
This high-ceilinged multimedia gallery of approximately  serves as the Royal Ontario Museum's main contemporary art exhibition space. The gallery has featured exhibitions on fashion photography, street art, Chinese urban design and architecture, and contemporary Japanese art.

References

External links
Royal Ontario Museum website
Institute for Contemporary Culture website

Museums in Toronto
Museums established in 1989